Armenian Sports Club was an Iranian football club based in Tehran, Iran. It was Iran's first sport club for Iranian-Armenians. It is not known exactly when the sport club ceased to exist, but it can be assumed that it was sometime in the 1930s as, in 1944, Ararat Tehran was established and became the sport club for Iranian-Armenians.

Honours

Managers
The team was managed for many years by Victor Aboyan, an Armenian engineer, fond of football, who came to Iran in 1938 from Tbilisi, Georgia.

References

https://web.archive.org/web/20190103040034/http://sportinfo.am/ – The Armenian sport news, federations, video, encyclopedia
https://web.archive.org/web/20081216025759/http://www.toopetalayi.com/menu.aspx?PageID=37

Defunct football clubs in Iran
Association football clubs established in 1922
Sport in Tehran
1922 establishments in Iran